Clegyr Boia, or Clegyr Fwya, is a prehistoric site on the St David's peninsula, Pembrokeshire, Wales,  above the surrounding area. The hilltop's rocky outcrop contains evidence of Neolithic and Iron Age settlements. The site was excavated in 1902 by Sabine Baring-Gould, and by Audrey Williams, for the Ancient Monuments Inspectorate, in 1943.

The outcrop became the stronghold of a 6th-century CE Irish pirate named Boia, after whom (with clegyr) it is now called.

Neolithic
Evidence of Neolithic settlement in Wales is extremely uncommon. Megalithic burial chambers are normally the only Neolithic structures to survive. However, an excavation of the site by Sabine Baring-Gould, in 1903, showed the remains of rectangular and circular Neolithic dwellings. An associated midden has been dated to around 5500 years before present (BP), during the early to middle Neolithic. Sherds of Neolithic round-bottomed pottery, polished stone axes and animal bones were also discovered. Baring-Gould thought the pottery may have been wheel-turned. No hearths were found within the dwellings. However, "substantial" charcoal deposits were found on the site, indicating fire was used, and carefully managed. Samples from the area of Neolithic occupation (hut and midden), radiocarbon dated in 1973, indicated a date of around 2370 BP, the beginning of La Tène culture, at the early British Iron Age, but were considered unacceptable by the National Museum Wales.

Iron Age
The hill's steep sides were augmented by a single earthen rampart, to form a defensive structure known as a hillfort. The enclosure's entrance may have been through a tunnel. Radiocarbon dated samples from near the hillfort entrance indicate a date of around 1950 BP (1 BCE), the late Iron Age.

References

Buildings and structures completed in the 1st century BC
Prehistoric sites in Pembrokeshire
Populated places established in the 5th millennium BC
Neolithic settlements
Stone Age sites in Wales
Hillforts in Pembrokeshire
Former populated places in Wales
1902 archaeological discoveries
1943 archaeological discoveries